Mob Wives Chicago is an American reality television series that premiered on VH1 on June 10, 2012. Developed as a spin-off of Mob Wives, with a new cast based in Chicago, Illinois.

On May 7, 2012, the introduction for the show was filmed behind Chicago's Cassidy Tire on Canal Street.

On April 29, 2012, the first promo for the show aired, during an episode of the original series. On May 27, 2012, a preview special of the series aired after the second season Mob Wives reunion special.

On October 14, 2012, cast member Pia Rizza tweeted that "#MobWivesChicago is over now I don't see the need to keep reliving the drama that killed the show time 2 move forward new chapter new time," confirming that Mob Wives Chicago had been canceled.

Cast

Main
 Pia Rizza is the daughter of Vincent Rizza, who worked for The Chicago Outfit, then subsequently testified against them and entered the Federal Witness Protection Program.
 Nora Schweihs is the daughter of the late Frank "The German" Schweihs, who was a notorious and feared hitman for the Chicago Mafia.
 Renee Fecarotta Russo is a niece of the now deceased "Big John" Fecarotta, who raised her and was also a loan collector and hitman for the Mafia.
 Christina Scoleri is the daughter of Raymond Janek, a one-time thief and fence for the Chicago Outfit.
 Leah DeSimone is the daughter of Wolf DeSimone, a reputed mafia associate.

Recurring
 Giana is Renee's 20-year-old daughter. Her father is serving life in prison for murder. Despite Renee's disagreement, Giana remains in contact with her father.
 Julie is Nora's best friend from Florida who is the only one that met her father. Also a psychic medium.
 Bella Rizza is Pia's teenage daughter.
 Dave is Renee's boyfriend, business partner, and one of Pia's acquaintances.
 Sheila Gambino is Pia's friend and niece of Carlo "Don Carlo" Gambino.

Episodes

International broadcast
In the UK it aired on ITVBe. In Australia the series premiered on Arena on May 2, 2015.

References

External links
 

2010s American reality television series
2012 American television series debuts
2012 American television series endings
English-language television shows
VH1 original programming
Television shows set in Chicago
Reality television spin-offs
Television series by The Weinstein Company
American television spin-offs
History of women in Illinois